Clayton Bartolo (born 2 June 1987) is a Maltese Partit Laburista (Labour Party) politician and the Minister for Tourism in Prime Minister Robert Abela's cabinet in early 2020.

He was elected as a member of the Parliament of Malta in June 2017.

References

1987 births
Living people
People from Pietà, Malta
21st-century Maltese politicians
Labour Party (Malta) politicians
University of Malta alumni